Trolli is a German manufacturer of confectionery. Its American arm was sold in 1996 and became a confectionery brand used by Ferrara Candy Company. Trolli sells gummy candies, marshmallows, and soft licorice gums in over 80 countries and has factories in Germany, Spain, Indonesia, USA, China and the Czech Republic.

History 
In 1948 Willy Mederer founded Willy Mederer KG, a company producing pasta in Fürth, Germany. When sugar rationing regulations were lifted the company changed production from pasta to confectionery.

The company grew in the 1950s and 1960s, widening the product range and rising to 150 staff. Candies were sold under the Wilmed brand, a portmanteau of Willy Mederer. Sales offices in Munich and Stuttgart were opened. In 1975 the company registered the 'Trolli' brand name that became the trading name for the company in 2012.

Willy Mederer died in 1984 and was succeeded by his son Herbert.

Trolli varieties were added, including sour flavours, double layered gummies with foam made using starch mogul machines and the 'Trolli-Burger'. Mederer received the 1993 Candy Kettle Award. A subsidiary, Trolli Iberica S.A., was founded in Valencia, Spain, in 1994. A production site was opened in Jakarta, Indonesia, in 1997. The Mederer Group later opened a packaging plant in Pilsen, Czech Republic.

eFruti, a fruit gummy brand from Neunburg vorm Wald, was acquired by the Mederer Group in 1998 and its name used, slightly altered to eFrutti, as a brand. Gummi Bear Factory of Boizenburg was bought in 2000.

In the United States 
In the 1980s Trolli exports to North America grew to 40 tonnes per day. In 1986 Mederer built a production facility in Creston, Iowa. Trolli's US operations were sold to Favorite Brands International in 1996 and subsequently owned by Nabisco (1999), Kraft Foods (2000), Wrigleys (2005), and Farley's & Sathers Candy Company (2006) which was merged with Ferrara Candy Company in 2013.

In 2004 Trolli introduced a roadkill themed gummy candy in the shape of chickens, squirrels, and snakes with tire tracks on them. Kraft Foods, then the owner of the Trolli US brand, pulled the candy from the market in 2005 in response to protests.

Sponsorship 
Trolli sponsored the football club SpVgg Greuther Fürth from 2010 to 2014, during which time their home stadium was named the Trolli Arena.

Manufacturing plants and factories 
Trolli GmbH has its headquarters in Fürth and has factories in Boizenburg, Neunburg vorm Wald and Hagenow.

In 2001 Mederer built a production site in Guangzhou, China in a joint venture with the Spanish company 'Multi Joyco'. in 2004 Mederer took over 100% of the enterprise. From China Trolli exports its products to nations in Asia, Australasia, North America and the Middle East.

In Europe Trolli has a manufacturing plant in Valencia, Spain, Italy and a packaging plant in Pilsen, Czech Republic.

They also have a production plant in Colombia under the manufacturer Aldor.

Products 
Trolli product ranges include: Original, Sour, Soft, Special, Liquorice, Extra Fruity, Marshmallows, Gelatine-free, Gluten, Vegetarian, Lactose-Free, Halal products and Gummy Frogs.

See also
 List of confectionery brands

References

External links 
 Trolli GmbH 
 Trolli US
 Trolli Ukraine

Brand name confectionery
German brands
German confectionery
Ferrara Candy Company brands
Products introduced in 1975